Charles Holloway (born 1789 in England; died 23 October 1846 at Stockbridge, Hampshire) was an English professional cricketer who played first-class cricket from 1816 to 1822.  He played for Hampshire and made 13 known appearances in first-class matches.  He represented the Players in the Gentlemen v Players series.

References

External links

Further reading
 Arthur Haygarth, Scores & Biographies, Volumes 1-2 (1744–1840), Lillywhite, 1862

1789 births
1846 deaths
English cricketers
English cricketers of 1787 to 1825
Players cricketers
Hampshire cricketers
William Ward's XI cricketers